Dahlemer Binz Airfield is a public general aviation airfield in the Eifel mountains of Germany. It is located in the municipality of Dahlem, about 35 kilometres southwest of Euskirchen.

The airfield is licensed for:
 Powered aircraft (incl. helicopters) up to 5,700 kg flying weight (Fluggewicht)
 Motor gliders
 Gliders, both winched and towed
 Microlights
 Hot air balloons
 Parachuting

External links 
 Dahlemer Binz

Airports in North Rhine-Westphalia
Eifel
Euskirchen (district)